Majella Brown (born 2 February 1980) is an  Australian female volleyball player. She was part of the Australia women's national volleyball team.

She competed with the national team at the 2000 Summer Olympics in Sydney, Australia, finishing 9th. She participated in the 2002 FIVB Volleyball Women's World Championship.

See also
 Australia at the 2000 Summer Olympics

References

External links
 
 http://corporate.olympics.com.au/athlete/majella-brown
 https://www.newspapers.com/newspage/120452443/

http://fivb.com/vis_web/volley/wwch2002/pdf/match011.pdf
http://www.canoe.com/2000GamesGallerySep22/volleyball1.html

1980 births
Living people
Australian women's volleyball players
People from Queensland
Volleyball players at the 2000 Summer Olympics
Olympic volleyball players of Australia